The 2001 Virginia gubernatorial election was held on November 6, 2001. Incumbent Republican Governor Jim Gilmore was barred from seeking a second term; Democratic nominee Mark Warner, the 1996 Democratic nominee for the U.S. Senate, defeated Republican nominee Mark Earley, the Attorney General of Virginia.

General election

Candidates

Mark Warner, (D), businessman, Democratic nominee for U.S. Senate from Virginia in 1996
Mark Earley, (R), Attorney General of Virginia (1997–2001); Virginia State Senator from VA-SD14 (1987–1997)

Campaign
Warner made a conscious effort to appeal to voters in rural Virginia, personified by his official campaign song, written by the Bluegrass Brothers. The song was considered an essential part of Warner's outreach to rural Virginia, with the lyrics emphasizing Warner's understanding of the culture of that part of the state.

Polling

Results

Results by county and city

References

2001
Virginia
Gubernatorial
November 2001 events in the United States
Mark Warner